Nicola Birkner (born 7 December 1969 in Berlin) is a German sailor. 
Together with Wibke Bülle she competed at the 2000 Olympics finishing fifth.

References

External links
 
 
 

1969 births
Living people
German female sailors (sport)
Olympic sailors of Germany
Sailors at the 2000 Summer Olympics – 470
Sportspeople from Berlin